Ballinasloe railway station (Irish: Stáisiún Iarnróid Bhéal Átha na Sluaighe) is a railway station in Ballinasloe, Co. Galway. It is operated by Iarnród Éireann (IÉ). Opened in 1851, this railway station is a fine and imposing Tudor style building, designed by George Wilkinson.

The station is on the Dublin to Galway Rail service. Passengers to or from Westport travel to Athlone and change trains. Passengers to or from Limerick and Ennis travel to Athenry and change trains.

History and design
The station was opened on 1 August 1851 by the Midland Great Western Railway. It is designed by George Wilkinson, and has been well-maintained since it was opened. The building is dressed with many gables that serve to articulate the roofline. The railway station is of considerable social and historical significance, having been built as part of the Great Midland and Western Railway network development in Ireland that improved the efficiency of public transport and linked remote areas of the country with larger urban settlements and ports.

See also
 List of railway stations in Ireland

References

External links
Irish Rail Ballinasloe Station Website

Ballinasloe
Iarnród Éireann stations in County Galway
Railway stations in County Galway
Railway stations opened in 1851
1851 establishments in Ireland

Railway stations in the Republic of Ireland opened in 1851